The 1996 Bash at the Beach was the third annual Bash at the Beach professional wrestling pay-per-view event produced by World Championship Wrestling (WCW). It took place on July 7, 1996 from the Ocean Center in Daytona Beach, Florida. The event is best remembered for Hulk Hogan's heel turn and the formation of the New World Order, which contributed greatly to the success of WCW in the mid-to-late 1990s.

The main event was a tag team match between The Outsiders (Kevin Nash and Scott Hall) and their mystery partner (revealed to be Hulk Hogan), and Macho Man Randy Savage, Sting and Lex Luger. Matches on the undercard included Ric Flair against Konnan for the WCW United States Heavyweight Championship, and Dean Malenko against Disco Inferno for the WCW Cruiserweight Championship. As of 2014, the event is available on the WWE Network.

Storylines
The event featured wrestlers from feuds and storylines. Wrestlers portrayed villains, heroes, or less distinguishable characters in the events that built tension and culminated in a wrestling match or series of matches.

The predominant storyline heading into the event was centered on The Outsiders (Scott Hall and Kevin Nash). It began on the May 27, 1996 episode of WCW Monday Nitro when Hall made his first appearance on WCW television, unnamed and unannounced, and declared his intention to invade WCW, making a challenge to Executive Vice President of WCW Eric Bischoff to pick three of his best wrestlers to face him and two partners to be named. The first of those partners was Nash, who debuted in WCW at the June 10, 1996, Nitro, and thereafter both were referred to as The Outsiders. At The Great American Bash, Bischoff told Hall and Nash their challenge was accepted. Hall and Nash demanded to know the identities of the three men. Bischoff refused, and Nash performed a powerbomb on him off the stage through a table. The following night on WCW Monday Nitro, a random drawing occurred and Randy Savage, Sting, and Lex Luger were chosen to face The Outsiders. The Outsiders refused to reveal the identity of their partner and continued to interrupt WCW events.

Event

Before the event officially began, Jim Powers defeated Hugh Morrus in a dark match. In matches taped for WCW Main Event, The Steiner Brothers (Rick Steiner and Scott Steiner) defeated WCW World Tag Team Champions Harlem Heat (Booker T and Stevie Ray) by disqualification, Bobby Walker defeated Billy Kidman, The Rock 'n' Roll Express (Ricky Morton and Robert Gibson) defeated Fire and Ice (Scott Norton and Ice Train), and Eddie Guerrero defeated Lord Steven Regal.

The first match was between Psychosis and Rey Misterio, Jr. After starting back and forth with both applying and countering holds, Psychosis performed a spinning heel kick, followed by a suicide dive to the outside. Psychosis dominated after, performing a diving leg drop across Misterio's throat. As Psychosis ran at Misterio on the apron, Misterio performed a monkey flip, sending Psychosis' head into the ringpost. Misterio gained the advantage, performing a headscissors takedown on the outside. Psychosis came back after a drop toe-hold, performing a senton from the top rope to the outside. Psychosis then applied the hammerlock, which Misterio countered with a snapmare, and kept the advantage by performing several aerial moves. Psychosis countered a headscissors takedown attempt into a powerbomb, and attempted a Splash Mountain. Misterio countered the attempt into a hurricanrana from the top rope and pinned Psychosis for the victory.

The second match was a Carson City Silver Dollar match between John Tenta and Big Bubba, who was accompanied by Jimmy Hart. Attached to one of the ringposts by straps was a tall steel pole, with a sock of silver coins hanging from the top. At the start of the match, both attempted to get the sock but were stopped by the other. Bubba climbed the turnbuckles but Tenta forced him to drop onto the top turnbuckle. After performing an atomic drop onto the turnbuckle, Tenta tossed Bubba to the outside. Tenta attempted to remove the straps. Bubba came back and uses a belt to choke Tenta. He then used athletic tape to tape Tenta's left wrist to the middle rope and continued attacking Tenta with the belt. As Bubba cut Tenta's hair with scissors, Tenta performed a low blow. Using the scissors, he cut his hand free and attempted to cut the straps. Bubba stopped him, and performed a spinebuster. Bubba then told Hart to climb the pole. As Hart got the sock, Tenta performed a scoop slam. Tenta grabbed the sock from Hart, hit Bubba with it, and pinned Bubba for the victory.

The third match was a Taped Fist match between Diamond Dallas Page and Jim Duggan for Page's "Lord of the Ring" ring. At the start of the match, Duggan knocked Page out of the ring with a shoulder block. After hanging Duggan on the top rope, Page pulled Duggan's legs around the ringpost and taped them together. As the referee was releasing Duggan, Page cut the tape around Duggan's hands. Duggan then struck Page with punches to the outside, where Duggan dropped Page onto the guard rail and sent his back into the ringpost. Back in the ring, Page countered a suplex attempt into a bulldog. Page climbed the turnbuckles but Duggan hit the top rope, causing Page to fall onto the top turnbuckle. After knocking Page's head repeatedly on the top turnbuckle, Duggan performed a clothesline, sending Page to the outside. Duggan then sent Page back in the ring. As he climbed through the ropes, Page kicked the middle rope, which hit Duggan's groin. Page then performed a Diamond Cutter, and he pinned Duggan to win and retain his ring. After the match, Duggan taped his right fist and punched Page.

The fourth match was a Double Dog Collar match between The Nasty Boys (Brian Knobs and Jerry Sags) and Public Enemy (Rocco Rock and Johnny Grunge). Rock was connected to Sags, and Grunge was connected to Knobs. All four fought to the outside, and used several weapons on each other. Grunge performed a bulldog on Knobs on a steel chair. Rock performed a somersault legdrop on Sags and performed an axe handle to him through a table. All four eventually return to the ring, where The Public Enemy had the advantage. Rock went to the top turnbuckle, but Sags pulled the chain, and Rock fell onto the table. Knobs repeatedly attacked Grunge with the chain. Sags then hit an axe handle with the chain on Rock, who was on a table. Knobs hanged Grunge with the chain over the top rope as The Nasty Boys delivered a clothesline to Rock with the chain. Sags hit Rock with the chain, and pinned him for The Nasty Boys to win.

The fifth match was between Dean Malenko and Disco Inferno for the WCW Cruiserweight Championship. Malenko dominated early in the match. He performed a brainbuster and worked on Inferno's left leg using a leglock and the STF, but failed to defeat Inferno. Inferno fought back with punches, a flapjack onto the top rope, and a forward Russian legsweep. Malenko came back with a crucifix armbar. Inferno came back with elbow strikes and blocked an axe handle attempt into a neckbreaker. Malenko performed a springboard dropkick and attempted the Texas Cloverleaf, but Inferno reversed it into an inside cradle. Malenko finally performed a double underhook powerbomb and applied the Texas Cloverleaf to win by submission and retain his title.

The sixth match was between Steve McMichael and Joe Gomez. The match started with McMichael attacking Gomez in the corner. Gomez came back with punches and performed a crossbody. The match then went back and forth until McMichael used a mule kick to Gomez's groin. McMichael then targeted Gomez's back, performing a pendulum backbreaker and applying the camel clutch. Gomez then applied the sleeper hold, which Gomez countered with a sitout jawbreaker. McMichael performed a shoulder neckbreaker and attempted the Figure four leglock. Gomez countered it into an inside cradle and followed with several attacks to the head. As Gomez bounced off the ropes, McMichael caught him and performed a Tombstone Piledriver. McMichael pinned Gomez for the victory.

The seventh match was between Ric Flair, accompanied by Miss Elizabeth and Woman, and Konnan for the WCW United States Heavyweight Championship. The match started at a slow pace. Konnan had a slight advantage, applying a side headlock and, later, the surfboard. After a gorilla press slam, Konnan sent Flair to the outside with a clothesline. As Konnan was on the top turnbuckle, Woman shook the ropes, causing him to fall. Flair gained the advantage afterwards. After using an illegal eye poke, Flair distracted the referee, allowing Woman to perform a low blow on Konnan. Konnan came back with punches and backhand chops. Konnan countered a figure four leglock attempt into an inside cradle. Konnan then performed a drop toe-hold and applied the figure four leglock himself, but Flair got to the ropes. After a one-handed bulldog and a rolling thunder lariat, Konnan attempted a pin, but Elizabeth distracted the referee, and Woman hit Konnan with her shoe. Flair then pinned Konnan with both feet on the top rope for leverage to win the match and the title.

The eighth match was between The Giant and The Taskmaster, and Arn Anderson and Chris Benoit. The Giant and The Taskmaster attacked Anderson and Benoit during their entrance into the arena. McMichael hit The Giant with a briefcase and The Giant chased him backstage. This allowed Benoit and Anderson to double-team The Taskmaster. The match officially started as The Giant returned to the ring. Benoit and Anderson continued to attack The Taskmaster for the first half of the match and prevented The Giant from tagging in. The Giant finally tagged in after The Taskmaster delivered a belly to back suplex. As The Giant dominated Anderson in the ring, Benoit fought The Taskmaster outside. The Giant performed a chokeslam, pinned Anderson for the win, and returned backstage. After the match, Benoit continued to attack The Taskmaster. Woman came down, but failed to stop Benoit. Benoit finally stopped when The Giant came back out.

The main event, labeled "Hostile Takeover Match" by commentators, was between The Outsiders (Kevin Nash and Scott Hall) and their mystery partner, and Randy Savage, Sting and Lex Luger. The Outsiders came down without their mystery partner, saying he was in the building, but they were capable by themselves. Luger and Hall started the match. As Nash held Luger onto the top turnbuckle, Sting hit a Stinger Splash on Nash, and Savage hit an axe handle on Hall. Luger, however, was unable to get out of the way and was knocked out cold. The match stopped to take Luger backstage. After the match resumed, Sting dominated Hall and tagged in Savage. Hall hit Savage coming off the top turnbuckle and Nash tagged in. Nash dominated Savage, then Sting. The Outsiders continued to beat down Sting. Sting came back with punches and finally tagged in Savage. Savage performed several diving axe handle smashes on Hall and Nash, but the rally was short lived as Hall distracted the referee long enough for Nash to hit a low blow on Savage.

Hulk Hogan then made his way down to the ring as Nash and Hall fled to the outside. In a surprise move, the longtime fan favorite Hogan then performed two Atomic Legdrops to Savage, revealing himself to be Hall and Nash's partner as The Outsiders returned to the ring to celebrate their new alliance as the stunned crowd looked on. The match officially ended in a no-contest after Hogan threw the referee out of the ring and hit Savage with one more Atomic Legdrop. After the main event, the audience began to throw trash in the ring. One fan jumped over the guardrail and tried to attack Hogan, but was taken out by Hall and Nash, before being escorted out of the arena by security. Gene Okerlund entered the ring and asked Hogan why he had turned his back on the fans and how he could align himself with Hall and Nash. Hogan claimed that the three of them were "the future of wrestling" and dubs the new group as "the new world order of wrestling, brother." Hogan went on to justify his actions, saying he was bored with WCW and had grown tired of constantly pandering to the fans, especially considering that more and more of them had started to turn on him since he had joined the company in 1994. Hogan declared their intention to take over the wrestling business and destroy everything in their path.

Reception & Aftermath

The reception by people to the event was a massive shock, the unthinkable happened, that the American Hero Hulk Hogan would backstab the ideals of Hulkamania, truth, justice, and the American way, turn evil, and join the New World Order.

After the event, Scott Hall, Kevin Nash and Hulk Hogan (renamed Hollywood Hogan), now known as the New World Order (nWo), continued their attempt at taking over WCW. On the July 15, 1996 edition of WCW Monday Nitro, the nWo attacked Lex Luger and Big Bubba after their match. On the July 29, 1996 episode of WCW Monday Nitro, The Outsiders attacked Arn Anderson, the American Males (Marcus Bagwell and Scotty Riggs), and Rey Misterio, Jr., whom Nash threw into a dressing room trailer, before driving off in a limousine. At Hog Wild, the following pay-per-view event, Hogan defeated The Giant to win the WCW World Heavyweight Championship. Afterwards, they spray painted the letters "NWO" onto the title belt, rechristening it as the official championship title of the nWo.

The nWo became a major part of the history of WCW as well as professional wrestling. The style and nature of mainstream American professional wrestling changed as a result, with storylines becoming more realistic and adult-oriented. While the original nWo ended in 1998, the nWo continued in WCW until 2000 through several different incarnations. The nWo angle aided WCW in their competition against rival company, the World Wrestling Federation (WWF), with Nitro gaining a higher rating than Monday Night Raw, the WWF's premiere television show, for 83 consecutive weeks.

In the original broadcast of the pay-per-view, color commentator Bobby Heenan exclaimed "whose side is he on?!" as Hogan entered the arena.  This comment was edited out on the Hulk Hogan anthology DVD, but has since been left in unedited in other broadcasts, such as on WWE Classics On Demand and on the WWE Network.

Results

References

Professional wrestling shows in Florida
Bash at the Beach
Events in Daytona Beach, Florida
1996 in Florida
July 1996 events in the United States
1996 World Championship Wrestling pay-per-view events